DePape is a surname with Dutch origins, mostly found in US, Canada, and France. It could refer to:

Brigette DePape, Canadian activist
David Wayne DePape, a suspect in the 2022 attack on Paul Pelosi

See also
 Lorne De Pape
 De Paepe
 Pape (disambiguation)